Inane Rovers Gaelic Football Club is a Gaelic Athletic Association club in County Tipperary, Ireland. The club was founded in 1950, is based outside Moneygall and plays Gaelic football in the North division of Tipperary GAA.

History
As hurling is the dominant sport in the North division, the club has had limited success at county level in its own right, but has contributed to the success of Thomas MacDonagh's, an amalgamation with other North division football clubs.

Honours
Tipperary Senior Football Championship (1)
 (as MacDonagh's) 2011
North Tipperary Senior Football Championship (5)
 1966
 (as MacDonagh's) 2007, 2008, 2009, 2010
North Tipperary Intermediate Football Championship (1)
 1998
 Tipperary Junior A Football Championship (2)
 1961, 2014
 North Tipperary Junior A Football Championship (12)
 1952, 1953, 1954, 1955, 1956, 1957, 1958, 1959, 1969, 1977, 1992, 1993
 Tipperary Under-21 A Football Championship (4)
 1968, 1972, 1977, 1979
 Tipperary Minor A Football Championship (1)
 1969
 North Tipperary Minor A Football Championship (21)
 1952, 1954, 1965, 1966, 1967, 1968, 1969, 1973, 1974, 1975, 1976, 1978, 1980, 1981, 1987, 1997, 1998, 2003, 2004, 2005, 2010
 Tipperary Minor B Football Championship (2)
 1995, 2012
 North Tipperary Minor B Football Championship (2)
 1995, 2012

References

External links
GAA Info Website
Tipperary GAA site

Gaelic games clubs in County Tipperary